The meridian 161° east of Greenwich is a line of longitude that extends from the North Pole across the Arctic Ocean, Asia, the Pacific Ocean, the Southern Ocean, and Antarctica to the South Pole.

The 161st meridian east forms a great circle with the 19th meridian west.

From Pole to Pole
Starting at the North Pole and heading south to the South Pole, the 161st meridian east passes through:

{| class="wikitable plainrowheaders"
! scope="col" width="130" | Co-ordinates
! scope="col" | Country, territory or sea
! scope="col" | Notes
|-
| style="background:#b0e0e6;" | 
! scope="row" style="background:#b0e0e6;" | Arctic Ocean
| style="background:#b0e0e6;" |
|-valign="top"
| style="background:#b0e0e6;" | 
! scope="row" style="background:#b0e0e6;" | East Siberian Sea
| style="background:#b0e0e6;" | Passing between the Medvyezhi Islands, Sakha Republic,  (at )
|-valign="top"
| 
! scope="row" | 
| Sakha Republic Chukotka Autonomous Okrug — from  Magadan Oblast — from 
|-
| style="background:#b0e0e6;" | 
! scope="row" style="background:#b0e0e6;" | Sea of Okhotsk
| style="background:#b0e0e6;" | Penzhin Bay
|-
| 
! scope="row" | 
| Kamchatka Krai — Kamchatka Peninsula
|-valign="top"
| style="background:#b0e0e6;" | 
! scope="row" style="background:#b0e0e6;" | Pacific Ocean
| style="background:#b0e0e6;" | Passing just east of Ujelang Atoll,  (at )
|-
| 
! scope="row" | 
| Island of Malaita
|-valign="top"
| style="background:#b0e0e6;" | 
! scope="row" style="background:#b0e0e6;" | Solomon Sea
| style="background:#b0e0e6;" | Passing just east of the island of Guadalcanal,  (at )
|-
| style="background:#b0e0e6;" | 
! scope="row" style="background:#b0e0e6;" | Coral Sea
| style="background:#b0e0e6;" | 
|-
| style="background:#b0e0e6;" | 
! scope="row" style="background:#b0e0e6;" | Pacific Ocean
| style="background:#b0e0e6;" |
|-
| style="background:#b0e0e6;" | 
! scope="row" style="background:#b0e0e6;" | Southern Ocean
| style="background:#b0e0e6;" |
|-
| 
! scope="row" | Antarctica
| Ross Dependency, claimed by 
|-
|}

See also
160th meridian east
162nd meridian east

e161 meridian east